Charles W. Hutchison (February 26, 1865 – July 8, 1945) was a member of the Wisconsin State Assembly and the Wisconsin State Senate.

Biography
Hutchison was born on February 26, 1865, in Mineral Point, Wisconsin. He died on July 8, 1945, in Mineral Point.

His son, David William Hutchison, became a Major General in the United States Air Force.

Career
Hutchison represented the 17th District of the Senate from 1927 to 1930. Previously, he was elected to the Assembly in 1922 and 1924. He was a Republican.

References

External links

People from Mineral Point, Wisconsin
Republican Party Wisconsin state senators
Republican Party members of the Wisconsin State Assembly
1865 births
1945 deaths
Burials in Wisconsin